The Indo-Pakistani War of 1971 was a military confrontation between India and Pakistan that occurred during the Bangladesh Liberation War in East Pakistan from 3 December 1971 until the Pakistani capitulation in Dhaka on 16 December 1971.  The war began with Pakistan's Operation Chengiz Khan, consisting of preemptive aerial strikes on 11 Indian air stations. The strikes led to India declaring war on Pakistan, marking their entry into the war for East Pakistan's independence, on the side of Bengali nationalist forces. India's entry expanded the existing conflict with Indian and Pakistani forces engaging on both the eastern and western fronts. Thirteen days after the war started, India achieved a clear upper hand, and the Eastern Command of the Pakistan military signed the instrument of surrender on 16 December 1971 in Dhaka, marking the formation of East Pakistan as the new nation of Bangladesh. Approximately 93,000 Pakistani servicemen were taken prisoner by the Indian Army, which included 79,676 to 81,000 uniformed personnel of the Pakistan Armed Forces, including some Bengali soldiers who had remained loyal to Pakistan. The remaining 10,324 to 12,500 prisoners were civilians, either family members of the military personnel or collaborators (Razakars).

It is estimated that members of the Pakistani military and supporting pro-Pakistani Islamist militias killed between 300,000 and 3,000,000 civilians in Bangladesh. As a result of the conflict, a further eight to ten million people fled the country to seek refuge in India.

During the 1971 Bangladesh war for independence, members of the Pakistani military and supporting pro-Pakistani Islamist militias called the Razakars raped between 200,000 and 400,000 Bangladeshi women and girls in a systematic campaign of genocidal rape.

Background 

The Indo-Pakistani conflict was sparked by the Bangladesh Liberation War, a conflict between the traditionally dominant West Pakistanis and the majority East Pakistanis. The political tensions between East Bengal and West Pakistan had its origin in the creation of Pakistan as a result of the partition of India by the United Kingdom in 1947; the popular language movement in 1950; mass riots in East Bengal in 1964; and the mass protests in 1969. These led to the resignation of President Ayub Khan, who invited army chief General Yahya Khan to take over the central government.

To overcome the Bengali domination and prevent formation of the central government in Islamabad, the controversial One Unit programme established the two wings of East and West Pakistan. West Pakistanis' opposition to these efforts made it difficult to effectively govern both wings. In 1969, President Yahya Khan announced the first general elections and disestablished the status of West Pakistan as a single province in 1970, in order to restore it to its original heterogeneous status comprising four provinces, as defined at the time of establishment of Pakistan in 1947. In addition, there were religious and racial tensions between Bengalis and the multi-ethnic West Pakistanis, as Bengalis looked different from the dominant West Pakistanis.

The general elections, held in 1970, resulted in East Pakistan's Awami League gaining 167 out of 169 seats for the East Pakistan Legislative Assembly, and a near-absolute majority in the 313-seat National Assembly, while the vote in West Pakistan was mostly won by the socialist Pakistan Peoples Party. The Awami League leader Sheikh Mujibur Rahman stressed his political position by presenting his Six Points and endorsing the Bengalis' right to govern. The League's election success caused many West Pakistanis to fear that it would allow the Bengalis to draft the constitution based on the six-points and liberalism.

To resolve the crisis, the Admiral Ahsan Mission was formed to provide recommendations. Its findings were met with favourable reviews from the political leaders of West Pakistan, with the exception of Zulfikar Ali Bhutto, the chairman of the Pakistan Peoples Party.

However, the military top brass vetoed the mission's proposal. Zulfikar Ali Bhutto endorsed the veto, and subsequently refused to yield the premiership of Pakistan to Sheikh Mujibur Rahman. The Awami League called for general strikes in the country. President Yahya Khan postponed the inauguration of the National Assembly, causing a shattering disillusionment to the Awami League and their supporters throughout East Pakistan. In reaction, Sheikh Mujibur Rahman called for general strikes that eventually shutdown the government, and dissidents in the East began targeting the ethnic Bihari community, which largely supported West Pakistan.

In early March 1971, approximately 300 Biharis were slaughtered in riots by Bengali mobs in Chittagong alone. The Government of Pakistan used the "Bihari massacre" to justify its deployment of the military in East Pakistan on 25 March, when it initiated its military crackdown. President Yahya Khan called on the military – which was overwhelmingly led by West Pakistanis – to suppress dissent in the East, after accepting the resignation of Lieutenant-General Yaqub Ali Khan, the chief of staff of the East-Pakistani military.

Mass arrests of dissidents began and, after several days of strikes and non-cooperation, the Pakistani military, led by Lieutenant-General Tikka Khan, cracked down on Dhaka on the night of 25 March 1971. The government outlawed the Awami League, which forced many of its members and sympathisers into refuge in Eastern India. Mujib was arrested on the night of 25/26 March 1971 at about 1:30 am (as per Radio Pakistan's news on 29 March 1971) and taken to West Pakistan. Operation Searchlight, followed by Operation Barisal, attempted to kill the intellectual elite of the east.

On 26 March 1971, Major Ziaur Rahman of Pakistan Army declared the independence of Bangladesh on behalf of Sheikh Mujibur Rahman.

In April, the exiled Awami League leaders formed a government-in-exile in Baidyanathtala of Meherpur. The East Pakistan Rifles and Bengali officers in Pakistan's army, navy, and marines, defected to the rebellion after taking refuge in different parts of India. The Bangladesh Force, namely the Mukti Bahini, consisting of Niyomito Bahini (Regular Force) and Oniyomito Bahini (Guerilla Force), was formed under the retired colonel Mohammad Ataul Gani Osmani.
There was also a meeting between Prime Minister Gandhi and President Nixon in November 1971, where she rejected the US advice against intervening in the conflict.

India's involvement in Bangladesh Liberation War 

After the resignations of Admiral S.M. Ahsan and Lieutenant-General Yaqub Ali Khan, the media correspondents began airing reports of the Pakistani military's widespread genocide against their Bengali citizens, particularly aimed at the minority Bengali Hindu population, which led to approximately 10 million people seeking refuge in the neighbouring states of Eastern India. The Indian government opened the East Pakistan–India border to allow the Bengali refugees to find safe shelter; the governments of West Bengal, Bihar, Assam, Meghalaya and Tripura established refugee camps along the border. The resulting flood of impoverished East Pakistani refugees strained India's already overburdened economy.

The Indian government repeatedly appealed to the international community for assistance, but failed to elicit any response, despite the External Affairs minister Swaran Singh meeting foreign ministers of other countries. Prime Minister Indira Gandhi on 27 March 1971 expressed full support of her government for the independence struggle of the people of East Pakistan, and concluded that instead of taking in millions of refugees, it was economical to go to war against Pakistan. On 28 April 1971, the Gandhi cabinet had ordered the Chief of the Army Staff General Sam Manekshaw to "Go into East Pakistan". Defected East Pakistan military officers and the elements of Indian Research and Analysis Wing (RAW) immediately started using the Indian refugee camps for recruitment and training of Mukti Bahini guerrillas that were to be trained against Pakistan.

Indian authorities also attempted to carry on psychological warfare and keep up the morale of comrades in East Pakistan. The Swadhin Bangla Betar Kendra (Free Bangladesh Radio Centre), which had broadcast Major Rahman's independence declaration, was relocated from Kalurghat in East Pakistan to India after the transmission building was shelled by Pakistani Sabre jets on 30 March 1971. It resumed broadcasts on 3 April from Tripura, aided by the Indian Border Security Force. The clandestine station was finally shifted to Kolkata, where it was joined by a large number of Bangladeshi radio programmers, newscasters, poets, singers and journalists. Its jurisdiction was transferred to the provisional Bangladesh government-in-exile, and made its first broadcast on 25 May, the birth anniversary of poet Kazi Nazrul Islam (who would later be named Bangladesh's national poet). Among the Indian contributors to the radio station's nationalistic programmes was Salil Chowdhury. Akashvani Kolkata also actively took part in this effort.

The news media's mood in Pakistan had also turned increasingly jingoistic and militaristic against East Pakistan and India when the Pakistani news media reported the complexity of the situation in the East, though the reactions from Pakistan's news media pundits were mixed. By the end of September 1971, a propaganda campaign, possibly orchestrated by elements within the Government of Pakistan, resulted in stickers endorsing "Crush India" becoming a standard feature on the rear windows of vehicles in Rawalpindi, Islamabad and Lahore; this soon spread to the rest of West Pakistan. By October, other stickers proclaimed Hang the Traitor in an apparent reference to Sheikh Mujibur Rahman. By the first week of December, the conservative print media outlets in the country had published jihad related materials to boost the recruitment in the military.

India's official engagement with Pakistan

Objective 

By the end of April 1971, Prime Minister Indira Gandhi had asked the Indian Army chief General Sam Manekshaw if he was ready to go to war with Pakistan. According to Manekshaw's own personal account, he refused, citing the onset of monsoon season in East Pakistan and also the fact that the army tanks were being refitted. He offered his resignation, which Gandhi declined. He then said he could guarantee victory if she would allow him to prepare for the conflict on his terms, and set a date for it; Gandhi accepted his conditions. In reality, Gandhi was well aware of the difficulties of a hasty military action, but she needed to get the military's views to satisfy her hawkish colleagues and the public opinion, which were critical of India's restraint.

By November 1971, an Indian-Pakistani war seemed inevitable. The Soviet Union reportedly warned Pakistan against the war, which they termed as "suicidal course for Pakistan's unity." Despite this warning, in November 1971, thousands of people led by conservative Pakistani politicians marched in Lahore and across Pakistan, calling for Pakistan to "crush India". India responded by starting a massive buildup of the Indian Army on the western borders; the army waited until December, when the drier ground in the East made for easier operations and the Himalayan passes were closed by snow, preventing any Chinese intervention.  On 23 November, President Yahya Khan declared a national state of emergency and told the country to prepare for war.

At the time of the attack, the Taj Mahal had been camouflaged with a forest of twigs and leaves and draped with burlap, because its marble glowed like a white beacon in the moonlight.

These pre-emptive strikes, known as Operation Chengiz Khan, were inspired by the success of Israeli Operation Focus in the Arab–Israeli Six-Day War.  Unlike the Israeli attack on Arab airbases in 1967, which involved a large number of Israeli planes, Pakistan flew no more than 50 planes to India.

In an address to the nation on radio that same evening, Prime Minister Gandhi held that the air strikes were a declaration of war against India and the Indian Air Force (IAF) responded with initial air strikes the same night. These expanded to massive retaliatory air strikes the next morning.

This air action marked the official start of the Indo-Pakistani War of 1971; Gandhi ordered the immediate mobilisation of troops and launched a full-scale invasion of Pakistan.  This involved Indian forces in massive coordinated air, sea and land assaults on Pakistan from all fronts.  The main Indian objective on the Eastern front was to capture Dacca, and on the Western front was to prevent Pakistan from entering Indian soil.

Naval hostilities and engagements 

Unlike the 1965 war, the Navy NHQ staffers and commanders of the Pakistan Navy knew very well that the Navy was ill-prepared for the naval conflict with India. The Pakistan Navy was in no condition of fighting an offensive war in deep sea against the Indian Navy, and neither was it in a condition to mount serious defence against Indian Navy's seaborne encroachment.

In the western theatre of the war, the Indian Navy's Western Naval Command under Vice admiral S.N. Kohli, successfully launched a surprise attack on Karachi port on the night of 4/5 December 1971 under the codename Trident. The naval attack involving the Soviet-built Osa missile boats sank the Pakistan Navy's destroyer  and minesweeper  while  was also badly damaged. Pakistani naval sources reported that about 720 Pakistani sailors were killed or wounded, and Pakistan lost reserve fuel and many commercial ships, thus crippling the Pakistan Navy's further involvement in the conflict. In retaliation, the Pakistan Navy submarines, Mangro, and Shushuk, began their operations to seek out the major Indian warships. On 9 December 1971, Hangor sank , inflicting 194 Indian casualties, and this attack was the first submarine kill since World War II.

The sinking of INS Khukri was followed by another Indian attack on Karachi port on the night of 8/9 December 1971 under the codename Python. A squadron of Indian Navy's Osa missile boats approached the Karachi port and launched a series of Soviet-acquired Styx missiles, that resulted in further destruction of reserve fuel tanks and the sinking of three Pakistani merchant ships, as well as foreign ships docked in Karachi. The Pakistan Air Force did not attack the Indian Navy ships, and confusion remained the next day when the civilian pilots of Pakistan International, acting as reconnaissance war pilots, misidentified  and the air force attacked its own warship, inflicting major damages and killing several officers on board.

In the eastern theatre of the war, the Indian Eastern Naval Command, under Vice Admiral Nilakanta Krishnan, completely isolated East Pakistan by a naval blockade in the Bay of Bengal, trapping the Eastern Pakistan Navy and eight foreign merchant ships in their ports. From 4 December onwards, the aircraft carrier  was deployed, and its Sea Hawk fighter-bombers attacked many coastal towns in East Pakistan, including Chittagong and Cox's Bazar. Pakistan countered the threat by sending the submarine , which sank off Visakhapatnam's coast, due to an internal explosion, though whether this was triggered by Indian depth charges, diving to avoid them or some other reason has never been established.

Due to high number of defections, the Navy relied on deploying the Pakistan Marines, led by Rear Admiral Leslie Mungavin, where they had to conduct riverine operations against the Indian Army, but they too suffered major losses, mainly due to their lack of understanding of expeditionary warfare and the wet terrain of East Pakistan.

The damage inflicted on the Pakistan Navy stood at 7 gunboats, 1 minesweeper, 1 submarine, 2 destroyers, 3 patrol crafts belonging to the coast guard, 18 cargo, supply and communication vessels; and large-scale damage inflicted on the naval base and docks in the coastal town of Karachi. Three merchant navy ships – Anwar Baksh, Pasni and Madhumathi – and ten smaller vessels were captured. Around 1900 personnel were lost, while 1413 servicemen were captured by Indian forces in Dacca. According to one Pakistani scholar, Tariq Ali, Pakistan lost half its navy in the war.

Air operations 

After the attempted pre-emptive attack, the PAF adopted a defensive stance in response to the Indian retaliation.  As the war progressed, the IAF continued to battle the PAF over conflict zones, but the number of sorties flown by the PAF decreased day–by–day.  The IAF flew 4,000 sorties while the PAF offered little in retaliation, partly because of the paucity of non-Bengali technical personnel.

This lack of retaliation has also been attributed to the deliberate decision of the PAF's AHQ to cut its losses, as it had already incurred huge losses in the conflict in the liberation war in the East.  The PAF avoided making contacts with the Indian Navy after the latter raided the port of Karachi twice, but the PAF did retaliate by bombing Okha harbour, destroying the fuel tanks used by the boats that had attacked.

In the east, No. 14 Squadron "Tail Choppers" was destroyed and its CO, Squadron Leader PQ Mehdi, was taken POW, putting Pakistan's air command in Dhaka out of commission. India thereby achieved total air superiority on the eastern front.

At the end of the war, PAF pilots made successful escapes from East Pakistan to neighbouring Burma; many PAF personnel had already left the East for Burma on their own before Dacca was overrun by the Indian military in December 1971.

Indian attacks on Pakistan

As the Indian Army tightened its grip in East Pakistan, the Indian Air Force continued with its attacks against Pakistan as the campaign developed into a series of daylight anti-airfield, anti-radar, and close-support attacks by fighter jets, with night attacks against airfields and strategic targets by Canberras and An-12s, while Pakistan responded with similar night attacks with its B-57s and C-130s.

The PAF deployed its F-6s mainly on defensive combat air patrol missions over their own bases, leaving the PAF unable to conduct effective offensive operations. The IAF's raids damaged one USAF and one UN aircraft in Dacca, while a RCAF DHC-4 Caribou was destroyed in Islamabad, along with the USAF's Beech U-8 owned by the US military's liaison chief Brigadier-General Chuck Yeager. Sporadic raids by the IAF continued against PAF forward air bases in Pakistan until the end of the war, and interdiction and close-support operations were maintained.

One of the most successful air raids by India into West Pakistan happened on 8 December 1971, when Indian Hunter aircraft from the Pathankot-based 20 Squadron, attacked the Pakistani base in Murid and destroyed 5 F-86 aircraft on the ground. This was confirmed by Pakistan's military historian, Air Commodore M Kaiser Tufail, in his book In The Ring and on Its Feet: Pakistan Air Force in the 1971 Indo-Pak War.

The PAF played a more limited role in the operations. They were reinforced by Mirages from an unidentified Middle Eastern ally (whose identity remains unknown). According to author Martin Bowman, "Libyan F-5s were reportedly deployed to Sargodha AFB, perhaps as a potential training unit to prepare Pakistani pilots for an influx of more F-5s from Saudi Arabia." The IAF was able to conduct a wide range of missions – troop support; air combat; deep penetration strikes; para-dropping behind enemy lines; feints to draw enemy fighters away from the actual target; bombing and reconnaissance. The PAF, which was solely focused on air combat, was blown out of the subcontinent's skies within the first week of the war. Those PAF aircraft that survived took refuge at Iranian air bases or in concrete bunkers, refusing to offer a fight.

India flew 1,978 sorties in the East and about 4,000 in Pakistan, while the PAF flew about 30 and 2,840 at the respective fronts.  More than 80 percent of IAF sorties were close-support and interdiction and about 45 IAF aircraft were lost.

Pakistan lost 60 to 75 aircraft, not including any F-6s, Mirage IIIs, or the six Jordanian F-104s which failed to return to their donors. The imbalance in air losses was explained by the IAF's considerably higher sortie rate and its emphasis on ground-attack missions.

Ground operations 

Before the start of the war, the Indian Army was well organised on both fronts and enjoyed significant numerical superiority over the Pakistan Army.  The Indian Army's extraordinary war performance at both fronts restored the prestige, confidence, and dignity that it had lost during the Sino-Indian War in 1962.

When the conflict started, the war immediately took a decisive turn in favour of India and their Bengali rebel allies militarily and diplomatically. On both fronts, Pakistan launched several ground offensives, but the Indian Army held its ground and initiated well-coordinated ground operations on both fronts. Major ground attacks were concentrated on the western border by the Pakistan Army, fighting together with the Pakistan Marines in the southern border, but the Indian Army was successful in penetrating into Pakistani soil. By the time the war came to end, the army soldiers and marines were highly demoralised– both emotionally and psychologically– on the western front and had no will to put up a defensive fight against the approaching Indian Army soldiers.

The War Enquiry Commission later exposed the fact that for the Pakistan Army and Pakistan Marines, the arms and training of marines, soldiers and officers were needed at every level, and every level of command.

On 23 November 1971, the Indian Army conventionally penetrated to the eastern fronts and crossed East Pakistan's borders to join their Bengali nationalist allies. Contrary to the 1965 war, which had emphasised set-piece battles and slow advances, this time the strategy adopted was a swift, three-pronged assault of nine infantry divisions with attached armoured units and close air support that rapidly converged on Dacca, the capital of East Pakistan. Lieutenant General Jagjit Singh Aurora, the General Officer Commanding-in-Chief of the Indian Army's Eastern Command, led the full Indian thrust into East Pakistan. As the Indian Eastern Command attacked the Pakistan Eastern Command, the Indian Air Force rapidly destroyed the small air contingent in East Pakistan and put the Dacca airfield out of commission.  In the meantime, the Indian Navy effectively blockaded East Pakistan.

The Indian campaign's "blitzkrieg" techniques exploited weaknesses in the Pakistani positions and bypassed opposition; this resulted in a swift victory. Faced with insurmountable losses, the Pakistani military capitulated in less than a fortnight and psychological panic spread in the Eastern Command's military leadership. Subsequently, the Indian Army encircled Dacca and issued an ultimatum to surrender in "30-minutes" time window on 16 December 1971. Upon hearing the ultimatum, the East-Pakistan government collapsed when the Lt-Gen. A.A.K. Niazi (Cdr. of Eastern Command) and his deputy, V-Adm. M.S. Khan, surrendered without offering any resistance. On 16 December 1971, Pakistan ultimately called for unilateral ceasefire and surrendered its entire four-tier military to the Indian Army– hence ending the Indo-Pakistani war of 1971.

On the ground, Pakistan suffered the most, with 8,000 killed and 25,000 wounded, while India only had 3,000 dead and 12,000 wounded. The loss of armoured vehicles was similarly imbalanced and this finally represented a major defeat for Pakistan.

Surrender of Pakistan Eastern Command in East Pakistan 

Officially, the Instrument of Surrender of Pakistan Eastern Command stationed in East Pakistan, was signed between the Lieutenant General Jagjit Singh Aurora, the GOC-in-C of Indian Eastern Command and Lieutenant-General A.A.K. Niazi, the Commander of the Pakistan Eastern Command, at the Ramna Race Course in Dacca at 16:31Hrs IST on 16 December 1971. There was a problem over who would represent the Bangladesh government, as the three Bangladeshi battalion commanders - Lt Cols Shafiullah, Khaled Musharraf and Ziaur Rahman - were located too far away to be airlifted on time. The responsibility fell on the only armed forces officer available, Gp Capt AK Khondkar, chief of the newly formed BAF. As the surrender was accepted silently by Lieutenant-General Aurora, the surrounding crowds on the race course started shouting anti-Pakistan slogans, and there were reports of abuses aimed at the surrendering commanders of Pakistani military. Indian officers and an Indian diplomat, MEA joint secretary for Pakistan AK Ray, had to form a human chain around Lt Gen Niazi to protect him from being lynched.

Hostilities officially ended at 14:30 GMT on 17 December, after the surrender on 16 December, and India claimed large gains of territory in Pakistan (although pre-war boundaries were recognised after the war). The war confirmed the independence of Bangladesh.

Following the surrender, the Indian Army took approximately 90,000 Pakistani servicemen and their Bengali supporters as POWs, making it the largest surrender since World War II. Initial counts recorded that approximately 79,676 war prisoners were uniformed personnel, and the overwhelming majority of the war prisoners were officers – most of them from the army and navy, while relatively small numbers were from the air force and marines; others in larger number were serving in paramilitary units.

The remaining prisoners were civilians who were either family members of the military personnel or collaborators (razakars). The Hamoodur Rahman Commission and the POW Investigation Commission reports instituted by Pakistan lists the Pakistani POWs as given in the table below.  Apart from soldiers, it was estimated that 15,000 Bengali civilians were also made prisoners of war.

Foreign reaction and involvement

United States and Soviet Union 

The Soviet Union sympathised with the East Pakistanis, and supported the Indian Army and Mukti Bahini's incursion against Pakistan during the war, in a broader view of recognising that the secession of East Pakistan as Independent Bangladesh would weaken the position of its rivals— the United States and China. The Soviet Union gave assurances to India that if a confrontation with the United States or China developed, it would take counter-measures. This assurance was enshrined in the Indo-Soviet Treaty of Friendship and Cooperation signed in August 1971.

The Soviet Union accepted the Indian position that any resolution to the crisis in East Pakistan would have to be on terms acceptable to India and the Awami League, but the Indo-Soviet treaty did not mean a total commitment to the Indian stance, according to author Robert Jackson. The Soviet Union continued economic aid to Pakistan and made sympathetic gestures to Pakistan until mid-October 1971. By November 1971, the Soviet ambassador to Pakistan Alexei Rodionov directed a secretive message (Rodionov message) that ultimately warned Pakistan that "it will be embarking on a suicidal course if it escalates tensions in the subcontinent".

The United States stood with Pakistan by supporting it morally, politically, economically and materially when U.S. President Richard Nixon and his Secretary of State Henry Kissinger refused to use rhetoric in a hopeless attempt to intervene in a large civil war. The U.S. establishment had the impression that the Soviets were in an informal alliance with India, and the US therefore needed Pakistan to help to limit Soviet influence in South Asia. During the Cold War, Pakistan was a close formal ally of the United States and also had close relations with the People's Republic of China, with whom Nixon had been negotiating a rapprochement and where he intended to visit in February 1972. Nixon feared that an Indian invasion of Pakistan would mean total Soviet domination of the region, and that it would seriously undermine the global position of the United States and the regional position of America's new tactical ally, China. Nixon encouraged Iran to send military supplies to Pakistan. The Nixon administration also ignored reports it received of the "genocidal" activities of the Pakistani military in East Pakistan, most notably the Blood telegram, and this prompted widespread criticism and condemnation – both by the United States Congress and in the international press.

Then U.S. Ambassador to the United Nations, George H. W. Bush, introduced a resolution in the UN Security Council calling for a cease-fire and the withdrawal of armed forces by India and Pakistan. However, it was vetoed by the Soviet Union, and the following days witnessed the use of great pressure on the Soviets from the Nixon-Kissinger duo to get India to withdraw, but to no avail.

When Pakistan's defeat in the eastern sector seemed certain, Nixon deployed Task Force 74, led by the aircraft carrier , into the Bay of Bengal. Enterprise and its escort ships arrived on station on 11 December 1971. According to a Russian documentary, the United Kingdom also deployed a carrier battle group led by the aircraft carrier  to the Bay, on her final deployment.

On 6 and 13 December, the Soviet Navy dispatched two groups of cruisers and destroyers from Vladivostok; they trailed US Task Force 74 into the Indian Ocean from 18 December 1971 until 7 January 1972. The Soviets also had a nuclear submarine to help ward off the threat posed by the USS Enterprise task force in the Indian Ocean.

As the war progressed, it became apparent to the United States that India was going to invade and disintegrate Pakistan in a matter of weeks, therefore President Nixon spoke with the USSR General Secretary Leonid Brezhnev on a hotline on 10 December, where Nixon reportedly urged Brezhnev to restrain India as he quoted: "in the strongest possible terms to restrain India with which ... you [Brezhnev] have great influence and for whose actions you must share responsibility."

After the war, the United States accepted the new balance of power and recognised India as a dominant player in South Asia; the US immediately engaged in strengthening bilateral relations between the two countries in the successive years. The Soviet Union, while being sympathetic to Pakistan's loss, decided to engage with Pakistan after sending an invitation through Rodionov to Zulfikar Ali Bhutto, who paid a state visit to the Soviet Union in 1972 to strengthen bilateral relations that continued over the years.

A 2019 study argues "that Nixon and Kissinger routinely demonstrated psychological biases that led them to overestimate the likelihood of West Pakistani victory" in the war, and that they overestimated "the importance of the crisis to broader U.S. policy. The evidence fails to support Nixon and Kissinger's own framing of the 1971 crisis as a contest between cool-headed realpolitik and idealistic humanitarianism, and instead shows that Kissinger and Nixon's policy decisions harmed their stated goals because of repeated decision-making errors."

China

During the course of the war, China harshly criticised India for its involvement in the East Pakistan crises, and accused India of having imperialistic designs in South Asia. Before the war started, Chinese leaders and officials had long been philosophically advising the Pakistan government to make peaceful political settlements with the East Pakistani leaders, as China feared that India was secretly supporting, infiltrating, and arming the Bengali rebels against the East Pakistani government. China was also critical of the Government of East Pakistan, led by its Governor Lieutenant-General Tikka Khan, which used ruthless measures to deal with the Bengali opposition, and did not endorse the Pakistani position on that issue.

When the war started, China reproached India for its direct involvement and infiltration in East Pakistan. It disagreed with Pakistani President Yahya Khan's consideration of military options, and criticised East Pakistan Awami League politicians' ties with India. China reacted with great alarm when the prospects of Indian invasion of Pakistan and integration of Pakistan-administered Kashmir into their side of Kashmir, became imminent. US President Nixon encouraged China to mobilise its armed forces along its border with India to discourage the Indian assault, but the Chinese did not respond to this encouragement since the Indian Army's Northern Command was well prepared to guard the Line of Actual Control, and was already engaging and making advances against the Pakistan Army's X Corps in the Line of Control.

China did not welcome the break-up of Pakistan's unity by the East Pakistani politicians, and effectively vetoed the membership of Bangladesh when it applied to the United Nations in 1972. China objected to admitting Bangladesh on the grounds that two UN resolutions concerning Bangladesh, requiring the repatriation of Pakistani POWs and civilians, had not yet been implemented. Furthermore, China was also among the last countries to recognise the independence of Bangladesh, refusing to do so until 31 August 1975. To this date, its relations with Bangladesh are determined by the Pakistan factor.

Sri Lanka 

Sri Lanka saw the partition of Pakistan as an example for themselves and feared India might use its enhanced power against them in the future. Despite the left wing government of Sirimavo Bandaranaike following a neutral non-aligned foreign policy, Sri Lanka decided to help Pakistan in the war. As Pakistani aircraft could not fly over Indian territory, they would have to take a longer route around India and so they stopped at Bandaranaike Airport in Sri Lanka where they were refuelled before flying to East Pakistan.

Arab World 
As many Arab countries were allied with both the United States and Pakistan, it was easy for Kissinger to encourage them to participate. He sent letters to both, the King of Jordan and the King of Saudi Arabia. President Nixon gave permission for Jordan to send ten F-104s and promised to provide replacements. F-86s from Saudi Arabia helped camouflage the extent of PAF losses, and some Libyan F-5s were reportedly deployed to Sargodha AFB, perhaps as a potential training unit to prepare Pakistani pilots for an influx of more F-5s from Saudi Arabia. In addition to these three countries, an unidentified Middle Eastern ally also supplied Pakistan with Mirage IIIs. However, other countries such as Syria and Tunisia were against interfering describing it as an internal matter of Pakistan.

Aftermath

India 
The war stripped Pakistan of more than half of its population, and with nearly one-third of its army in captivity, clearly established India's military and political dominance of the subcontinent. India successfully led a diplomatic campaign to isolate Pakistan. In addition, Prime Minister Indira Gandhi's state visit to United Kingdom and France further helped break ice with the United States, and blocked any pro-Pakistan resolution in the United Nations. 

The victory also defined India's much broader role in foreign politics, as many countries in the world had come to realise – including the United States – that the balance of power had shifted to India as a major player in the region. In the wake of changing geopolitical realities, India sought to establish closer relations with regional countries such as Iran, which was a traditional ally of Pakistan. The United States itself accepted a new balance of power, and when India conducted a surprise nuclear test in 1974, the US notified India that it had no "interest in actions designed to achieve new balance of power."

In spite of the magnitude of the victory, India was surprisingly restrained in its reaction. Mostly, Indian leaders seemed pleased by the relative ease with which they had accomplished their goals—the establishment of Bangladesh and the prospect of an early return to their homeland of the 10 million Bengali refugees who were the cause of the war. In announcing the Pakistani surrender, Prime Minister Indira Gandhi declared in the Indian Parliament:

 Colonel John Gill of National Defense University, US, remarks that, while India achieved a military victory, it was not able to reap the political fruits it might have hoped for in Bangladesh. After a brief 'honeymoon' phase between India and Bangladesh, their relationship began to sour. The perceived Indian overstay revived Bangladeshi anxieties of Hindu control. Many were concerned that Mujib was permitting Indian interference in the country's internal matters and many in the Bangladeshi army resented his attachment with India. Whilst India enjoys excellent relations with Bangladesh during the Awami League tenures, relations deteriorated when the Bangladesh Nationalist Party assumed power. A 2014 Pew Research Center opinion poll found that 27% of Bangladeshis were wary of India. However, 70% of Bangladeshis held a positive view of India: while 50% of Bangladeshis held a positive view of Pakistan.

Pakistan 
For Pakistan, the war was a complete and humiliating defeat, a psychological setback that came from a defeat at the hands of rival India. Pakistan lost half its population and a significant portion of its economy, and suffered setbacks to its geopolitical role in South Asia. In the post-war era, Pakistan struggled to absorb the lessons learned from the military interventions in the democratic system and the impact of the Pakistani military's failure was grave and long-lasting.

From the geopolitical point of view, the war ended in the breaking-up of the unity of Pakistan from being the largest Muslim country in the world to its politico-economic and military collapse that resulted from a direct foreign intervention by India in 1971. Pakistani policy-makers further feared that the two-nation theory had been disproved by the war, that Muslim nationalism had proved insufficient to keep Bengalis a part of Pakistan.

The Pakistani people were not mentally prepared to accept the magnitude of this kind of defeat, as the state media had been projecting imaginary victories. When the ceasefire that came from the surrender of East Pakistan was finally announced, the people could not come to terms with the magnitude of defeat; spontaneous demonstrations and massive protests erupted on the streets of major metropolitan cities in Pakistan.  According to Pakistani historians, the trauma was extremely severe, and the cost of the war for Pakistan in monetary terms and in human resources was very high.  Demoralized and finding itself unable to control the situation, the Yahya administration fell when President Yahya Khan turned over his presidency to Zulfikar Ali Bhutto, who was sworn in on 20 December 1971 as President with the control of the military.

The loss of East Pakistan shattered the prestige of the Pakistani military.  Pakistan lost half its navy, a quarter of its air force, and a third of its army.  The war also exposed the shortcomings of Pakistan's declared strategic doctrine that the "defence of East Pakistan lay in West Pakistan". Hussain Haqqani, in his book Pakistan: Between Mosque and Military notes,

In his book The 1971 Indo-Pak War: A Soldier's Narrative, Pakistan Army's Major General Hakeem Arshad Qureshi, a veteran of this conflict, noted:

After the war, the Pakistan Army's generals in the East held each other responsible for the atrocities committed, but most of the burden was laid on Lieutenant-General Tikka Khan, who earned notoriety from his actions as governor of the East; he was called the "Butcher of Bengal" because of the widespread atrocities committed within the areas of his responsibility. Unlike his contemporary Yaqub who was a pacifist and knew well of the limits of force, Tikka was a "soldier known for his eager use of force" to settle his differences.

Lieutenant-General A. A. K. Niazi commented on Tikka's actions: "On the night between 25/26 March 1971, General Tikka struck. Peaceful night was turned into a time of wailing, crying and burning. General Tikka let loose everything at his disposal as if raiding an enemy, not dealing with his own misguided and misled people. The military action was a display of stark cruelty more merciless than the massacres at Bukhara and Baghdad by Chengiz Khan and Halaku Khan ... General Tikka ... resorted to the killing of civilians and a scorched earth policy. His orders to his troops were: 'I want the land and not the people'".  Major-General Rao Farman wrote in his table diary: "Green land of East Pakistan will be painted red," which has been interpreted to mean that he planned to massacre Bengalis. Farman said the entry was not expressing a thirst for blood, but concern that East Pakistan's future could be the red flag of Communism.

Major reforms were carried out by successive governments in Pakistan after the war in the light of many recommendations made in the Hamoodur Rahman Commission Report.  To address the economic disparity, the National Finance Commission system was established to equally distribute the taxation revenue among the four provinces, the large-scale nationalisation of industries and nationwide census were carried out in 1972.  The Constitution was promulgated in 1973 that reflected this equal balance and a compromise between Islamism and Humanism, and provided guaranteed equal human rights to all.  The military was heavily reconstructed and heavily reorganised, with President Bhutto appointing chiefs of staff in each inter-service, contrary to C-in-Cs, and making instruction on human rights compulsory in the military syllabus in each branch of inter-services. Major investments were directed towards modernising the navy.  The military's chain of command was centralized in Joint Staff Headquarters (JS HQ) led by an appointed Chairman Joint Chiefs Committee to coordinars military efforts to safeguard the nation's defence and unity.  In addition, Pakistan sought to have a diversified foreign policy, as Pakistani geostrategists had been shocked that both China and the United States provided limited support to Pakistan during the course of the war, with the US displaying an inability to supply weapons that Pakistan needed the most.

On 20 January 1972, Pakistan under Bhutto launched the clandestine development of nuclear weapons with a view to "never to allow[ing] another foreign invasion of Pakistan."  This crash programme reached parity in 1977 when the first weapon design was successfully achieved.

Bangladesh 

As a result of the war, East Pakistan became an independent country, Bangladesh, as the world's fourth most populous Muslim state on 16 December 1971. West Pakistan, now just Pakistan, secured the release of Sheikh Mujibur Rahman from the Headquarter Prison and allowed him to return to Dacca.  On 19 January 1972, Mujib was inaugurated as the first President of Bangladesh, later becoming the Prime Minister of Bangladesh in 1974.

On the brink of defeat in around 14 December 1971, the media reports indicated that the Pakistan Army soldiers, the local East Pakistan Police they controlled, razakars and the Shanti Committee carried out systematic killings of professionals such as physicians, teachers, and other intellectuals, as part of a pogrom against the Bengali Hindu minorities who constituted the majority of urban educated intellectuals.

Young men, especially students, who were seen as possible rebels and recruiters were also targeted by the stationed military, but the extent of casualties in East Pakistan is not known, and the issue is itself controversial and contradictory among the authors who wrote books on the pogrom; the Pakistani government denied the charges of involvement in 2015.  R.J. Rummel cites estimates ranging from one to three million people killed.  Other estimates place the death toll lower, at 300,000.  Bangladesh government figures state that Pakistani forces aided by collaborators killed three million people, raped 200,000 women and displaced millions of others.

According to authors Kenton Worcester, Sally Bermanzohn and Mark Ungar, Bengalis themselves killed about 150,000 non-Bengalis living in the East. There had been reports of Bengali insurgents indiscriminately killing non-Bengalis throughout the East; however, neither side provided substantial proofs for their claims and both Bangladeshi and Pakistani figures contradict each other over this issue.  Bihari representatives in June 1971 claimed a higher figure of 500,000 killed by Bengalis.

In 2010, the Awami League's government decided to set up a tribunal to prosecute the people involved in alleged war crimes and those who collaborated with Pakistan.  According to the government, the defendants would be charged with crimes against humanity, genocide, murder, rape and arson.

According to John H. Gill, there was widespread polarisation between pro-Pakistan Bengalis and pro-liberation Bengalis during the war, and those internal battles are still playing out in the domestic politics of modern-day Bangladesh. To this day, the issue of committed atrocities and pogroms is an influential factor in the Bangladesh–Pakistan relations.

Impact

Pakistan: War Enquiry Commission and War prisoners

In the aftermath of the war, the Pakistani Government constituted the War Enquiry Commission, to be headed by Chief Justice Hamoodur Rahman, who was an ethnic Bengali, and composed of the senior justices of the Supreme Court of Pakistan. The War Enquiry Commission was mandated with carrying out thorough investigations into the intelligence, strategic, political and military failures that causes the defeat in the war.

The War Commission also looked into Pakistan's political and military involvement in the history of East Pakistan that encompasses 1947–71. The First War Report was submitted in July 1972, but it was very critically opined and penned on political misconducts of politicians and the military interference in national politics. Written in moral and philosophical perspective, the First Report was lengthy and provided accounts that were unpalatable to be released to the public. Initially, there were 12 copies that were all destroyed, except for the one that was kept and marked as "Top Secret" to prevent the backlash effects on the demoralised military. In 1976, the Supplementary Report was submitted, which was the comprehensive report compiled together with the First Report; this report was also marked as classified.

In 2000, the excerpts of the Supplementary Report were leaked to a political correspondent of Pakistan's Dawn, which the Dawn published together with India Today. The First Report is still marked as classified, while the Supplementary Report's excerpts were suppressed by the news correspondents. The War Report's supplementary section was published by the Pakistan Government, but it did not officially hand over the report to Bangladesh despite its requests.

The War Report exposed many military failures, from the strategic to the tactical–intelligence levels, while it confirmed the looting, rapes and the unnecessary killings by the Pakistan military and their local agents. It laid the blame squarely on Pakistan Army generals, accusing them of debauchery, smuggling, war crimes and neglect of duty. The War Commission had recommended public trial of Pakistan Army generals on the charges that they had been responsible for the situation in the first place and that they had succumbed without a fight, but no actions were ever taken against those responsible, except the dismissal of chiefs of the Pakistan Army, Pakistan Air Force, Pakistan Navy, and decommissioning of the Pakistan Marines.

The War Commission, however, rejected the charge that 200,000 Bengali girls were raped by the Pakistan Army, remarking, "It is clear that the figures mentioned by the Dacca authorities are altogether fantastic and fanciful," and cited the evidence of a British abortion team that had carried out the termination of "only a hundred or more pregnancies". The Commission also claimed that "approximately 26,000 persons (were) killed during the action by the Pakistan military"
Bina D'Costa states that the War Commission was aware of the military's brutality in East Pakistan, but "chose to downplay the scale of the atrocities committed."

The second commission was known as Indo-Pakistani War of 1971 Prisoners of War Investigation, conducted solely by the Pakistani government, that was to determine the numbers of Pakistani military personnel who surrendered, including the number of civilian POWs. The official number of the surrendered military personnel was soon released by the Government of Pakistan after the war was over.

India: Indo-Pakistani summits

On 2 July 1972, the Indo-Pakistani summit was held in Simla, Himachal Pradesh, India where the Simla Agreement was reached and signed between President Zulfikar Ali Bhutto and Prime Minister Indira Gandhi. The treaty provided insurance to Bangladesh that Pakistan recognised Bangladesh's sovereignty, in exchange for the return of the Pakistani POWs.  Over the next five months, India released more than 90,000 war prisoners, with Lieutenant-General A.A.K. Niazi being the last war prisoner to be handed over to Pakistan.

The treaty also gave back more than 13,000 km2 of land that the Indian Army had seized in Pakistan during the war, though India retained a few strategic areas, including Turtuk, Dhothang, Tyakshi (earlier called Tiaqsi) and Chalunka of Chorbat Valley, which was more than 804 km2. The Indian hardliners, however, felt that the treaty had been too lenient to President Bhutto, who had pleaded for leniency, arguing that the fragile stability in Pakistan would crumble if the accord was perceived as being overly harsh by Pakistanis and that he would be accused of losing Kashmir in addition to the loss of East Pakistan. As a result, Prime Minister Gandhi was criticised by a section in India for believing Bhutto's "sweet talk and false vows", while the other section claimed the agreement to be successful, for not letting it to fall into "Versailles Syndrome” trap.

In 1973, India and Pakistan reached another compromise when both countries signed a trilateral agreement with Bangladesh that actually brought the war prisoners, non-Bengali and Pakistan-loyal Bengali bureaucrats and civilian servants to Pakistan. The Delhi Agreement witnessed the largest mass population transfer since the Partition of India in 1947.

Bangladesh: International Crimes Tribunal

In 2009, the issue of establishing the International Crimes Tribunal began to take public support. The tribunal was formally established in 2010 to investigate and prosecute suspects for the genocide committed in 1971 by the Pakistan Army and their local collaborators, Razakars, Al-Badr and Al-Shams during the Bangladesh Liberation War.

Long-term consequences 
 Steve Coll, in his book Ghost Wars, argues that the Pakistan military's experience with India, including Pervez Musharraf's experience in 1971, influenced the Pakistani government to support jihadist groups in Afghanistan even after the Soviets left, because the jihadists were a tool to use against India, including bogging down the Indian Army in Kashmir.
 Writing about the war in Foreign Affairs magazine, Zulfikar Ali Bhutto stated "There is no parallel in contemporary history to the cataclysm which engulfed Pakistan in 1971. A tragic civil war, which rent asunder the people of the two parts of Pakistan, was seized by India as an opportunity for armed intervention. The country was dismembered, its economy shattered and the nation's self-confidence totally undermined." This statement of Bhutto has given rise to the myth of betrayal prevalent in modern Pakistan. This view was contradicted by the post-War Hamoodur Rahman Commission, ordered by Bhutto himself, which in its 1974 report indicted generals of the Pakistan Army for creating conditions which led to the eventual loss of East Pakistan and for inept handling of military operations in the East.

Military awards

Battle honours 
After the war, 41 battle honours and 4 theatre honours were awarded to units of the Indian Army; notable among them are:

 East Pakistan 1971 (theatre honour)
 Sindh 1971 (theatre honour)
 Jammu and Kashmir 1971 (theatre honour)
 Punjab 1971 (theatre honour)
 Basantar River
 Bogra
 Chachro
 Chhamb
 Defence of Punch
 Dera Baba Nanak
 Gadra City
 Harar Kalan
 Hilli
 Longewala
 Parbat Ali
 Poongli Bridge
 Shehjra
 Shingo River Valley
 Sylhet

Gallantry awards 
For bravery, a number of soldiers and officers on both sides were awarded the highest gallantry award of their respective countries. Following is a list of the recipients of the Indian award Param Vir Chakra, Bangladeshi award Bir Sreshtho and the Pakistani award Nishan-E-Haider:

India
Recipients of the Param Vir Chakra:
 Lance Naik Albert Ekka (Posthumously)
 Flying Officer Nirmal Jit Singh Sekhon (Posthumously)
 Major Hoshiar Singh
 Second Lieutenant Arun Khetarpal (Posthumously)

Bangladesh
Recipients of the Bir Sreshtho:
 Captain Mohiuddin Jahangir (Posthumously)
 Lance Naik Munshi Abdur Rouf (Posthumously)
 Sepoy Hamidur Rahman (Posthumously)
 Sepoy Mostafa Kamal (Posthumously)
 ERA Mohammad Ruhul Amin (Posthumously)
 Flight Lieutenant Matiur Rahman (Posthumously)
 Lance Naik Nur Mohammad Sheikh (Posthumously)

Pakistan

Recipients of the Nishan-E-Haider:
 Major Muhammad Akram (Posthumously)
 Pilot Officer Rashid Minhas (Posthumously)
 Major Shabbir Sharif (Posthumously)
 Sarwar Muhammad Hussain (Posthumously)
 Lance Naik Muhammad Mahfuz (Posthumously)

Civilian awards
On 25 July 2011, Bangladesh Swadhinata Sammanona, the Bangladesh Freedom Honour, was posthumously conferred on former Indian Prime Minister Indira Gandhi.

R. M. Muzumdar - IOFS officer. Second Indian Director General of the Indian Ordnance Factories. He was awarded the Padma Bhushan by the Government of India, in 1973, in the Civil service category, for his contributions during the Indo-Pakistani War of 1971.

O. P. Bahl, an IOFS officer. Former Additional Director General Ordnance Factories and Member of the Ordnance Factory Board. Received Padma Shri, in 1972 in the civil-service category for his efforts during the war.

On 28 March 2012, President of Bangladesh Zillur Rahman and the Prime Minister Sheikh Hasina conferred Bangladesh Liberation War Honour and Friends of Liberation War Honour to 75 people, six organisations, Mitra Bahini and the people of India at a special ceremony at the Bangabandhu International Conference Centre, Dhaka.  This included eight heads of states: former Nepalese President Ram Baran Yadav, the third King of Bhutan Jigme Dorji Wangchuck, former Soviet General Secretary Leonid IIyich Brezhnev, former Soviet head of state Nikolai Viktorovich Podgorny, former Soviet Prime Minister Alexei Nikolaevich Kosygin, former Yugoslav President Marshal Josip Broz Tito, former UK Prime Minister Sir Edward Richard George Heath and former Nepalese Prime Minister Bishweshwar Prasad Koirala.  The organisations include the BBC, Akashbani (All India Radio), International Committee of the Red Cross, United Nations High Commissioner for Refugees, Oxfam and Kolkata University Shahayak Samiti.

The list of foreign friends of Bangladesh has since been extended to 568 people.  It includes 257 Indians, 88 Americans, 41 Pakistanis, 39 Britons, 9 Russians, 18 Nepalese, 16 French and 18 Japanese.

In media

Films
 Hindustan Ki Kasam, a 1973 Bollywood war film directed by Chetan Anand about Operation Cactus Lilly.
 Aakraman, 1975 Bollywood film set during this war featuring a romantic love triangle.
 Border, a 1997 Bollywood war film directed by J.P.Dutta. This movie is an adaptation from real life events that happened at the Battle of Longewala fought in Rajasthan (Western Theatre).
 16 December, 2002 film directed by Mani Shankar.
 1971 – Prisoners of War, a 2007 Bollywood war film directed by Amrit Sagar. Set against the backdrop of a prisoner-of-war camp in Pakistan, it follows six Indian prisoners awaiting release after their capture in the 1971 India-Pakistan war.
 The Ghazi Attack, a 2017 war film directed by Sankalp Reddy. It is based on the sinking of PNS Ghazi during the war.
 1971: Beyond Borders, a 2017 Indian war drama film written and directed by Major Ravi.
 Raazi, 2017 fictional spy film set before the events of war about the detection of plan to deploy PNS Ghazi
 Romeo Akbar Walter, 2019 spy film.
 Bhuj: The Pride of India, 2021 action film set during the war.

Short films
 Mukti: Birth of a Nation, a 2017 short film directed by Manu Chobe depicts the negotiations between Major General J. F. R. Jacob and Lieutenant General A. A. K. Niazi over the Pakistani Instrument of Surrender.

Miniseries/Dramas

See also 

 Bangladesh Liberation War
 Post–World War II air-to-air combat losses
 List of aerial victories during the Indo-Pakistani War of 1971
 Indo-Pakistani War of 1965
 Separatist nationalism in Pakistan
 Muslim nationalism in South Asia
 Pakistani nationalism
 Conservatism in Pakistan
 Socialism in Pakistan
 Bangladesh Forces
 Timeline of the Bangladesh War
 Radcliffe Line
 Pakistan and state-sponsored terrorism
 India and state-sponsored terrorism
 United States–Pakistan relations before 1990
 Soviet Union-Pakistan relations before 1990
 Tridev Roy
 Operation Searchlight\Barisal
 Riverine Warfare
 Protest of 1969 in Pakistan
 Pakistan Air Force in East Pakistan
 Pakistan news media in Indo-Pakistani war of 1971
 International Crimes Tribunal (Bangladesh)
 Indian Army in East Pakistan
 Pakistan-Afghanistan relations
 1971 Winter POWs/MIA Investigations, Pakistan
 Pakistan military deployments in other countries
 Pakistan and weapons of mass destruction

General
 History of Bangladesh
 History of Myanmar
 List of conflicts in Asia

References

Further reading 
 
 
 Hayes, Jarrod.   "Securitization, social identity, and democratic security: Nixon, India, and the ties that bind." International Organization 66.1 (2012): 63-93.  online
 
 
 
 
 
 Warner, Geoffrey.  "Nixon, Kissinger and the breakup of Pakistan, 1971." International Affairs 81.5 (2005): 1097-1118.

External links
 Video of General Niazi Surrendering
 A complete coverage of the war from the Indian perspective
 An Atlas of the 1971 India – Pakistan War: The Creation of Bangladesh by John H. Gill
 Actual conversation from the then US President Nixon and Henry Kissinger during the 1971 War – US Department of State's Official archive.
 Indian Army: Major Operations
 Pakistan: Partition and Military Succession USA Archives
 Pakistan intensifies air raid on India BBC
 A day by day account of the war as seen in a virtual newspaper.
 The Tilt: The U.S. and the South Asian Crisis of 1971.
 16 December 1971: any lessons learned? By Ayaz Amir – Pakistan's Dawn
 India-Pakistan 1971 War as covered by TIME
 Indian Air Force Combat Kills in the 1971 war (unofficial), Centre for Indian Military History
 Op Cactus Lilly: 19 Infantry Division in 1971, a personal recall by Lt Col Balwant Singh Sahore
 All for a bottle of Scotch, a personal recall of Major (later Major General) C K Karumbaya, SM, the battle for Magura
 

 
Indo-Pakistani wars
Bangladesh Liberation War
1971 in India
Conflicts in 1971
History of East Pakistan
Anti-Pakistan sentiment
Wars involving Bangladesh
Wars involving Pakistan
Wars involving India
Post-independence history of Pakistan
Separatism in Pakistan
History of the Indian Army
Research and Analysis Wing
Foreign intervention
Dissolutions of countries
December 1971 events in Asia
Attacks in Bangladesh